Imad al-Din Zengi ( – 14 September 1146), also romanized as Zangi, Zengui, Zenki, and Zanki, was a Turkmen atabeg, who ruled Mosul, Aleppo, Hama, and, later, Edessa. He was the namesake of the Zengid dynasty.

Early life
Zengi's father, Aq Sunqur al-Hajib, governor of Aleppo under Malik-Shah I, was beheaded by Tutush I for treason in 1094.  At the time, Zengi  was about 10 years old and brought up by Kerbogha, the governor of Mosul.

Zengi against Damascus
Following the death in 1128 of Toghtekin, atabeg of Damascus, a power vacuum threatened to open Syria to renewed Crusader aggression. Zengi became atabeg of Mosul in 1127 and of Aleppo in 1128, uniting the two cities under his personal rule, and was formally invested as their ruler by the Sultan Mahmud II. Zengi had supported the young sultan against his rival, the caliph al-Mustarshid.

In 1130 Zengi allied with Taj al-Mulk Buri of Damascus against the Crusaders, but this was only a ruse to extend his power; he had Buri's son taken prisoner and seized Hama from him. Zengi also besieged Homs, the governor of which was accompanying him at the time, but could not capture it, so he returned to Mosul, where Buri's son and the other prisoners from Damascus were ransomed for 50,000 dinars. The next year, Zengi agreed to return the 50,000 dinars if Buri would deliver to him Dubais ibn Sadaqa, emir of al-Hilla in Iraq, who had fled to Damascus to escape al-Mustarshid. When an ambassador from the caliph arrived to bring Dubais back, Zengi attacked him and killed some of his retinue; the ambassador returned to Baghdad without Dubais.

Mahmud II died in 1131, setting off a war for the succession. As the Seljuk princes were occupied fighting one another in Persia, Zengi marched on Baghdad to add it to his dominions. He was defeated by the caliph's troops, however, and only escaped thanks to the help of the governor of Tikrit, Najm ad-Din Ayyub, future father of Saladin. Several years later, Zengi would reward the governor with a position in his army, paving the way for Saladin's brilliant career.

In 1134 Zengi became involved in Artuqid affairs, allying with the emir Timurtash (son of Ilghazi) against Timurtash's cousin Rukn al-Dawla Da'ud. Zengi's real desires, however, lay to the south, in Damascus. In 1135 Zengi received an appeal for help from Shams ul-Mulk Isma'il, who had succeeded his father Buri as emir of Damascus, and who was in fear for his life from his own citizenry, who considered him a cruel tyrant. Ismail was willing to surrender the city to Zengi in order to restore peace. None of Isma'il's family or advisors wanted this, however, and Isma'il was murdered by his own mother, Zumurrud, to prevent him from turning over the city to Zengi's control. Isma'il was succeeded by his brother Shihab al-Din Mahmud.

Zengi was not discouraged by this turn of events and arrived at Damascus anyway, still intending to seize it. The siege lasted for some time with no success on Zengi's part, so a truce was made and Shahib al-Din's brother Bahram-Shah was given as a hostage. At the same time, news of the siege had reached the caliph and Baghdad, and a messenger was sent with orders for Zengi to leave Damascus and take control of the governance of Iraq. The messenger was ignored, but Zengi gave up the siege, as per the terms of the truce with Shihab al-Din. On the way back to Aleppo, Zengi besieged Homs, whose governor had angered him, and Shihab al-Din responded to the city's call for help by sending Mu'in al-Din Unur to govern it.

Conflict with the Crusaders and Byzantines
In 1137 Zengi besieged Homs again, but Mu'in al-Din successfully defended it.  In response, Damascus allied with the Crusader Kingdom of Jerusalem against him. That year, Zengi laid siege to a Crusader fortress during the battle of Ba'rin and quickly crushed the army of Jerusalem. King Fulk of Jerusalem agreed to surrender and was allowed to flee with his surviving troops. Zengi, realizing that this new expedition against Damascus was bound to fail, made peace with Shahib al-Din, just in time to be confronted at Aleppo by an army sent by the Byzantine Emperor John II Comnenus. The Emperor had recently brought the Crusader Principality of Antioch under Byzantine control, and had allied himself with Joscelin II of Edessa and Raymond of Antioch. Facing a combined Byzantine/Crusader threat, Zengi mobilized his forces and recruited assistance from other Muslim leaders. In April 1138 the armies of the Byzantine emperor and the Crusader princes laid siege to Shaizar, but they were turned back by Zengi's forces a month later.

In May 1138 Zengi came to an agreement with Damascus. He married Zumurrud Khatun, the same woman who had murdered her son Ismail, and received Homs as her dowry. In July 1139 Zumurrud's surviving son, Shihab al-Din, was assassinated, and Zengi marched on Damascus to take possession of the city. The Damascenes, united under Mu'in al-Din Unur, acting as regent for Shihab al-Din's successor Jamal al-Din, once again allied with Jerusalem to repel Zengi. Zengi also besieged Jamal al-Din's former possession of Baalbek, and Mu'in al-Din was in charge of its defenses as well. Zengi obtained its surrender in response to a promise of safe passage; he did not honor it, ordering that the defenders be crucified. He granted the territory to his lieutenant Najm al-Din Ayyub, father of Saladin. After Zengi abandoned his siege of Damascus, Jamal al-Din died of a disease and was succeeded by his son Mujir al-Din, with Mu'in al-Din remaining as regent.

Mu'in al-Din signed a new peace treaty with Jerusalem for their mutual protection against Zengi. While Mu'in al-Din and the crusaders joined together to besiege Banias in 1140, Zengi once more laid siege to Damascus, but quickly abandoned it again. There were no major engagements between the crusaders, Damascus, and Zengi for the next few years, but Zengi in the meantime campaigned in the north and captured Ashib and the Armenian fortress of Hizan.

In 1144, Zengi began the siege of Edessa against the crusader County of Edessa, the weakest and least Latinized crusader state, and captured it on December 24, 1144, after a siege of four months. This event led to the Second Crusade, and later Muslim chroniclers noted it as the start of the jihad against the Crusader states.

Death and legacy
Zengi continued his attempts to take Damascus in 1145, but he was assassinated by a Frankish slave named Yarankash in September 1146, after the atabeg drunkenly threatened him with punishment for drinking from his goblet. Zengi was the founder of the eponymous Zengid dynasty. In Mosul he was succeeded by his eldest son Sayf al-Din Ghazi I, and in Aleppo he was succeeded by his second son Nur al-Din.  When Sayf died in 1149, he was succeeded in Mosul by a third son Qutb al-Din Mawdud.

According to Crusader legend, Zengi's mother was Ida of Austria (mother of Leopold III of Austria), who had supposedly been captured during the Crusade of 1101 and placed in a harem. She was 46 in 1101, Zengi was born in 1085, and his father died in 1094 so this is not possible.

Zengi was courageous, strong in leadership and a very skilled warrior according to all of the Muslim chroniclers of his day.

Unlike Saladin at Jerusalem in 1187, Zengi did not keep his word to protect his captives at Baalbek in 1139. According to Ibn al-‘Adim, Zengi "had sworn to the people of the citadel with strong oaths and on the Qur’an and divorcing (his wives).  When they came down from the citadel he betrayed them, flayed its governor and hanged the rest.”

According to Ibn 'al-Adim:

References

Sources
 .
Amin Maalouf, The Crusades Through Arab Eyes, 1985
Steven Runciman, A History of the Crusades, vol. II: The Kingdom of Jerusalem. Cambridge University Press, 1952.
The Damascus Chronicle of the Crusades, Extracted and Translated from the Chronicle of Ibn al-Qalanisi. H.A.R. Gibb, 1932 (reprint, Dover Publications, 2002).
William of Tyre, A History of Deeds Done Beyond the Sea, trans. E.A. Babcock and A.C. Krey. Columbia University Press, 1943.
An Arab-Syrian Gentleman and Warrior in the Period of the Crusades; Memoirs of Usamah ibn-Munqidh (Kitab al i'tibar), trans. Philip K. Hitti. New York, 1929.
The Second Crusade Scope and Consequences Edited by Jonathan Phillips & Martin Hoch, 2001.
The Chronicle of Michael the Syrian - (Khtobo D-Makethbonuth Zabne) (finished 1193-1195)
Taef El-Azhari, Zengi and the Muslim Response to the Crusades, Routledge, Abington, UK, 2006.

Zengid rulers
1080s births
1146 deaths
12th-century Syrian people
Syrian people of Turkish descent
Iraqi people of Turkish descent
Muslims of the Second Crusade
Turkic rulers
Atabegs
12th-century Turkic people
Seljuk Empire
12th-century monarchs in the Middle East
Zengid emirs of Mosul